Peter James Daltrey (born 25 March 1946 in Bow, East London, England) is an English musician. He has been the lead singer and chief songwriter for the bands Kaleidoscope and Fairfield Parlour. He is also a solo artist.

Biography

After the demise of the bands Kaleidoscope  and Fairfield Parlour,  Daltrey concentrated on his solo recording projects.  His first album, Dream On (Voiceprint VP182), was released on the British Voiceprint label in 1995, followed by two albums released in Japan: English Roses (Evangel EV001-1995) and When We Were Indians (Evangel EV003 - 1996).

In 1997, Daltrey worked with Universal Records on the compilation album, Dive into Yesterday (Fontana 534003-02),  a collection of tracks from Kaleidoscope's two 1960s albums. The band re-emerged from obscurity with reissues of their albums, beginning in 1987; their "lost" double concept album, White Faced Lady (UFO BFTP 001) was released in 1991.

In 1997 Daltrey was invited by the Dutch composer and instrumentalist Arjen Anthony Lucassen (Ayreon) to work with him on his double concept album, Into the Electric Castle. He also contributed two titles on the album (Transmission TM-014 International 1998). In 2004, he appeared shortly on the Ayreon album The Human Equation, reprising his role from Into the Electric Castle, and the following year sang on the re-release of Ayreon's first album, The Final Experiment, providing lead vocals for an acoustic version of "Nature's Dance".

A fan of Clifford T. Ward, Daltrey was guest of honour at an October 1998 convention where he delivered a speech of appreciation.

Blueprint Records released a collection of Daltrey's best solo work in 1999 on Candy: The Best of Peter Daltrey (Blueprint BP304CD.)  The turn of the century saw the release of Daltrey's album, Tambourine Days (Chelsea Records CDCR 000110) with the title track looking back at his earlier career, and the many friends who had shared that long frustrating road.

In 2000, Daltrey began a collaboration with the New Orleans-based singer-songwriter, Damien Youth. Their first album, Nevergreen (Chelsea Records CDCR 002110) was released that year.  This was followed by two more solo albums, Heroine (Chelsea Records CDCR 100110) in 2001 and The Last Detail (Chelsea Records CDCR 209010) in September 2002.  The collaboration with Youth continued in November 2002 with the release of their second album, Tattoo (Chelsea Records CDCR 201110).  Two months later Daltrey's first solo single was released on Earworm Records, "(Love Song) For Annie" / "Gypsy Gypsy" (with Damien Youth) (Earworm Records).

In April 2003, after the discovery of some rare Kaleidoscope acetate discs the band authorised their release, Kaleidoscope - The Sidekicks Sessions (CD Alchemy).  In September BBC recordings were released, Please Listen to the Pictures (Circle Records CPWL/CPWC 104), its cover art featuring many photographs and clippings from Daltrey's extensive band archive.  The following month he released Pittsburg Warhola (Chelsea Records CDCR 300110) under the pen name Link Bekka.  He and Youth then formed The Morning Set band, and released their first album, The Morning Set, at the end of 2006.

In 2007, Link Bekka, released two more albums: The Madness of King Bekka (Chelsea Records CDCR 707010) and Saharaville (Chelsea Records CDCR 709010). In 2009, Link Bekka collaborated with the saxophonist, Derek G Head for the album, Jacks Town an appreciation of the work of Jack Kerouac.

Daltrey is also a writer and a photographer He has recently returned to writing poetry, where it all began.

Daltrey`s upcoming projects include contributions to a pictorial book on the Isle of Wight Festival 1970, together with a TV documentary of the event, and an album with Philly psych band The Asteroid #4. His son, Oli, was involved in The Fog Band from 2000-2006.

Discography

With Kaleidoscope/Fairfield Parlour
Tangerine Dream (1967)
Faintly Blowing (1969)
From Home to Home (1970)
White Faced Lady (1991)

Solo
Dream On (1995)
English Roses (1995)
When We Were Indians (1996)
Candy: The Best of Peter Daltrey (1999)
Tambourine Days (2000)
Nevergreen (2000) (with Damien Youth)
Heroine (2001)
The Last Detail (2002)
Tattoo (2002) (with Damien Youth)
Pittsburg Warhola (2003) (as Link Bekka)
The Morning Set (2007) (with Damien Youth as The Morning Set)
The Madness of King Bekka (2007) (as Link Bekka)
Saharaville (2007) (as Link Bekka)
Jack's Town (2008) (as Link Bekka)
Fractured (2009) (as Link Bekka)
Errinern (2010) (as Link Bekka)
Heroine Tattoo (2010) (with Damien Youth)
King of Thieves: The Best of Peter Daltrey/Volume 2 (2011)
The Life of a Butterfly (2015) (with Damien Youth and Mike Dole)
Running through Chelsea (2023) (with Mark Mortimer)

With The Asteroid #4
The Journey (2012)

Bibliography
Tambourine Days by Peter Daltrey / Blurb Books (2011)

External links
 https://sites.google.com/view/kaleidoscope-uk/home
 http://www.blurb.co.uk/user/kaleidobooks
 https://peterdaltrey.bandcamp.com/
 https://500px.com/linkbekka
 https://www.thinklikeakey.com/
 https://sites.google.com/view/kaleidoscopeuk/news

1946 births
Living people
People from Bow, London
English rock singers
Progressive rock musicians
20th-century English painters
English male painters
21st-century English painters
Rocket Girl artists
20th-century English male artists
21st-century English male artists